Water on the Table is a Canadian documentary film directed, produced and written by filmmaker Liz Marshall. The film explores Canada's relationship to its freshwater resources and features Canadian activist Maude Barlow in her pursuit to protect water from privatization. Counterbalancing Barlow's views are those of policy and economic experts who assert that water is a resource and a commodity like any other.

Summary 
Water on the Table follows Barlow over the course of a year, from 2008-2009, as she serves as the United Nations Senior Advisor on Water to Father Miguel d'Escoto Brockmann, the President of the United Nations General Assembly for its 63rd session. During that period, the film also captures Barlow's involvement in the North Simcoe Landfill (Site 41) case, which takes place near the town of Barrie, Ontario. The pristine Alliston aquifer was threatened by county council plans to build a landfill site on top of it. The film also follows Barlow on a fact-finding excursion to Fort McMurray, Alberta to learn about the effects of oil sands operations on water sources such as the Athabasca River and its impact on First Nations communities, namely the Dene and Cree peoples of Fort Chipewyan.

Barlow's contention that water "must be declared a public trust"  has its basis in her involvement with water rights issues going back to the Canada-US Free Trade Agreement in the 1980s, when water was under consideration as a tradable good under the terms of that agreement. She continued to be involved in the issue when water was carried over for consideration as both a tradable good and an investment source in the subsequent North American Free Trade Agreement (NAFTA). She continues to be involved in the issue in her capacity as the national chair of the Council of Canadians. She has also written numerous books on a range of social and political issues, most recently Blue Covenant: The Global Water Crisis and The Coming Battle for the Right to Water.

Barlow's contention is debated in Water on the Table by the dissenting voices of policy and economic experts, including:

 Terence Corcoran, editor of the Financial Post and long-time journalist writing on economic and business policy issues
 Marcel Boyer, senior economist with the Montreal Economic Institute
Elizabeth Brubaker, executive director of Environment Probe and a member of Canada's National Round Table on the Environment and the Economy
 Robert Pastor, international affairs expert, former U.S. presidential advisor, Vice President of International Affairs and Professor of International Relations at American University, and founder of the Center for North American Studies, which focuses on the aim of understanding and building a North American Community, and 
Erik R. Peterson, senior advisor with the Center for Strategic and International Studies (CSIS) think tank in Washington, D.C. and director with the A.T. Kearney Global Business Policy Council.

Water on the Table rounds out the water conflict debates with moments of cinematic tribute to water. The film features images of watersheds, wetlands, rivers, estuaries, waterfalls and lakes by Canadian cinematographer Steve Cosens.

The broadcast hour version of Water On The Table premiered March 24, 2010 on TVO's documentary series The View From Here.

Awards and distinctions 

 Honourable Mention, Canada's Environmental Media Association Awards, 2011
 Featured Canadian Film for Cinema Politica, 2011
 Best Canadian Feature award, Planet in Focus Environmental Film Festival 2010
 Donald Brittain Award for Best Social Political Documentary, Gemini Award nomination, 2010

See also 
Flow: For Love of Water, a 2008 documentary on water privatization
Waterlife

References

External links 
 
 
  Council of Canadians Water Web page 
  President of the 63rd Session – United Nations General Assembly Web page
 Bulk Water Removals, Water Exports and the NAFTA on Government of Canada Web site

Canadian documentary television films
English-language Canadian films
2010 television films
2010 films
Documentary films about water and the environment
Water privatization
Privatization in Canada
Films about privatization
2010 documentary films
Films about activists
Films directed by Liz Marshall
2010s Canadian films